Moussonia is a genus of plants in the family Gesneriaceae. Its native range stretches from Mexico to Central America. It is found in Costa Rica, El Salvador, Guatemala, Honduras, Mexico and Panamá.

Description
They are herbaceous plants, or shrubs. It has an erect, branched stem, without scaly rhizomes. The leaves are arranged in the opposite way. The inflorescences are axillary, in cymes or solitary flowers. The corolla is red, orange or yellow, in the form of a long tube, which is broader in the centre. With the base of the extremities and narrow throat. The fruit (or seed capsule) is a dry, ovoid or ellipsoidal bivalve capsule.

Taxonomy 
It was previously included in the genus Kohleria, but with a different chromosomal number 2n=11, the ring-shaped nectary and without rhizomes. The molecular results support the separation of this genus. 

The genus name of Moussonia is in honour of Albert Mousson (1805–1890), a physicist and a malacologist from Switzerland.. 
It was first described and published in Flora Vol.31 on page 248 in 1848.

Species
Plants of the World Online (Kew) accepts 22 species;

Moussonia elegans  is the type species.

References

Other sources
 Roalson, E. H., J. K. Boggan & L. E. Skog 2005. Reorganization of tribal and generic boundaries in the Gloxinieae (Gesneriaceae: Gesnerioideae) and the description of a new tribe in the Gesnerioideae, Sphaerorrhizeae. Selbyana 25(2): 225–238.
 Stevens, W. D., C. Ulloa U., A. Pool & O. M. Montiel 2001. Flora de Nicaragua. Monogr. Syst. Bot. Missouri Bot. Gard. 85: i–xlii, 1–2666

Gesneriaceae genera
Plants described in 1848
Flora of Mexico
Flora of Central America
Gesnerioideae